No Problem! is a Channel 4 sitcom that ran from 1983 to 1985, created by the Black Theatre Co-operative. The show was written by Farrukh Dhondy and Mustapha Matura, from the Black Theatre Co-operative. Twenty-seven episodes were broadcast of the programme, which focused on a family of Jamaican heritage, the Powells, living in a council house in Willesden Green, London. It was voted Britain's 100th best sitcom in a poll carried out by the BBC.

Synopsis
No Problem! was the first sitcom to be broadcast on Britain's new Channel 4 TV station. It was also the first comedy series specifically to address the lifestyle of the British black community. The show's producers made a conscious decision to focus on comedy rather than "race issues", which drew some criticism.  Writing for the BFI website Screenonline, critic Mark Duguid said:The 1980s saw television moving with the times and beginning to respond, albeit awkwardly, to calls for greater sophistication in black representations. No Problem! (ITV, 1983–85) drew its cast and creators from the Black Theatre Co-operative, and concerned the teenage and twenty-something Powell kids, left to fend for themselves in a Willesden council house after their parents have returned to Jamaica. But the accent was on comedy, not politics, and the show quickly alienated some black activists, who objected to the narrow roles allotted to its female characters, to its casual jokes at the expense of Asians (ironic given its Asian co-writers, Farukh Dhondy and Mustapha Matura), and even to the scenario itself, which, in the words of cultural critic Paul Gilroy, put "voluntary repatriation at the heart of the situation".

Cast
Bellamy: Victor Romero Evans
Beast: Malcolm Frederick
Sensimilia: Judith Jacob
Angel: Janet Kay
Susannah: Sarah Lam
Terri: Shope Shodeinde
Toshiba: Chris Tummings
Melba: Angela Wynter
Director/producer: Micky Dolenz of The Monkees

References

External links
 Guide to Comedy

No Problem! – Episode Guide
No Problem – Series 1 – Episode 1 – Part 1 – from Janet Kay's official YouTube channel
No Problem – Series 1 – Episode 1 – Part 2
No Problem – Series 1 – Episode 1 – Part 3

Black British sitcoms
Channel 4 sitcoms
1983 British television series debuts
1985 British television series endings
1980s British sitcoms
English-language television shows
Television series by ITV Studios
London Weekend Television shows